Citizens Savings and Trust Company was a  bank in Cleveland, Ohio founded as the Citizens Savings and Loan Association. J.H. Wade established the bank and served as its chair. Hubbell & Benes, a Cleveland architectural firm that did many projects for he and his family, built the Citizens Building for the bank in 1903. The bank was merged into Union Trust in December 1920 and Joseph Randolph Nutt became president.

References

Banks based in Ohio
Companies based in Cleveland
Banks disestablished in 1920
Defunct banks of the United States
Defunct companies based in Ohio
Banks with year of establishment missing
Banks based in Cleveland
1920 disestablishments in Ohio